The Nhật Tân Bridge (or Vietnam–Japan Friendship Bridge) is a cable-stayed bridge crossing the Red River in Hanoi, inaugurated on 4 January 2015. It forms part of a new six-lane highway linking Hanoi and Noi Bai International Airport. The project is funded by a Japan International Cooperation Agency ODA loan.

Each span has 11 pairs of cables.

Nhat Tan Bridge was designed and built to become a new icon of the capital, its five towers symbolizing the five ancient gates of Hanoi. In the summer of 2017, Hanoi partnered with the Dutch company Philips to illuminate the bridge at night. The system is claimed to be able to create 16.7 million colors.

Gallery

References

External links

Hong River
Bridges in Hanoi
Bridges completed in 2015
Cable-stayed bridges in Vietnam
Japan International Cooperation Agency
Japan–Vietnam relations
Bridge light displays